Turbonilla hecuba is a species of sea snail, a marine gastropod mollusk in the family Pyramidellidae, the pyrams and their allies.

Description
The shell grows to a length of 6.1 mm.

Distribution
This species occurs in the following locations:
 Northwest Atlantic: off Nova Scotia at a depth of 35 m.

Notes
Additional information regarding this species:
 Distribution: Barrington Passage, Nova Scotia

References

External links
 To Biodiversity Heritage Library (1 publication)
 To Encyclopedia of Life
 To ITIS
 To World Register of Marine Species

hecuba
Gastropods described in 1913